Emperor Duzong of Song (2 May 1240 – 12 August 1274), personal name Zhao Qi, was the 15th emperor of the Song dynasty of China and the sixth emperor of the Southern Song dynasty. He was a nephew of his predecessor, Emperor Lizong, and reigned from 1264 until his death in 1274.

His birth name was Zhao Mengqi but his name was changed to Zhao Zi in 1251 and finally to Zhao Qi in 1253 after he was designated as Emperor Lizong's heir apparent. Duzong's reign was filled with rebellions and warfare; the court was dominated by his chancellor Jia Sidao and Duzong himself gave in into drinking and women, thus abandoning his duties. He died in 1274 leaving behind three young boys, one of whom took the throne as Emperor Gong. He is the last Emperor of the Song to issue coins; subsequent Emperors were too busy fighting the Mongols to establish mints to cast any coins and did not have enough resources. People later blame him for the fall of the Song dynasty.

Early life
Despite his mother's attempt to induce an abortion (thinking herself of low social status), Duzong was born in 1224 and would later be named heir to the Song Dynasty throne. The drugs his mother took as a method of attempted abortion affected him in many ways, impacting his intelligence, speech (allegedly he could not speak until 7 years of age), and his hands and feet were poorly developed and awkward to use. He was Yurui's only son. Like his uncle Zhao Yun, he lived in Shaoxing.

Discovery
Duzong was discovered by his paternal uncle Zhao Yun, better known as Emperor Lizong in 1253, who was sonless and therefore had no heirs so to compensate, adopted Duzong and designated him crown prince in 1260, an action historians still view as confusing. Emperor Lizong died in 1264 and Emperor Duzong then ascended the throne.

Reign
Emperor Duzong's reign was plagued with rebellions, warfare and corruption in his court; many officials accused the chancellor Jia Sidao of corruption but Duzong trusted Jia Sidao who Duzong honoured by bowing down to Jia even calling him "teacher" and according to anecdotes, when Jia was considering resigning, Duzong knelt down in tears begging Jia to remain in office.

Emperor Duzong ignored his duties and instead delegated all state and military affairs to the hands of Jia Sidao; the emperor instead indulged in drinking, women, and lived in opulence. To make things even worse, Duzong’s intelligence was lower than a normal person and he was often depressed. At first, he told the officials to be straightforward and tell him the problems in the countries, but this was all an act. Soon, he completely neglected his duties. Furthermore, he had a very high sexual appetite. Under Song laws, any woman who had sexual relations with the emperor had to pay respects to the emperor every morning. At one point, there were as many as 30 women paying their respects to Emperor Duzong in one morning. Duzong also gave official documents to four of his most favored women.

Mongol Invasion 
The Mongols had spent decades harassing the Song Empire's borders and were on the verge of conquering the whole of China. Emperor Duzong however, ignored this problem instead choosing to drink and indulging in sex because when Duzong heard that Xiangyang was being besieged by Mongol troops, Duzong asked Jia Sidao "I hear that Xiangyang had been besieged by the Yuan troops for several years. Is this true?" in which Jia said in all seriousness "Well, I haven't heard such a thing." Duzong replied with "A palace maid told me this."

Siege of Xiangyang 

Lu Wenhuan sent a messenger to Emperor Duzong, to request immediate reinforcements to defend Xiangyang. The messenger successfully got by the Yuan forts and reached the emperor but upon hearing the effectiveness of these new trebuchets, the emperor considered Xiangyang lost and did not send reinforcements. The decisive Battle of Xiangyang was fought in 1274 when the Mongols succeeded in capturing and destroying the last Song stronghold. The loss of Xiangyang sealed the fate of the Song dynasty and the news of its capture was deliberately hidden from Emperor Duzong by Jia Sidao.

Death 
Reports are disputed over how the Emperor died. Some say that he died from overindulgence in wine. But Historian Richard L. Davis and other sources claim that Duzong died suddenly from a severe negligence of a Palace Doctor. In any case, he was succeeded by his sixth son, Zhao Xian (Emperor Gong), who was then only four years old. Although Emperor Duzong was technically not the last emperor of the Song dynasty, historians see him as the last Song emperor who could have made decisions that would've significantly halted or even prevented the fall of the dynasty, as Gong was forced to abdicate two years later at the age of 6. His reign ended  with Chancellor Jia Sidao's execution, but the collapse of the Song Dynasty was inevitable as the Mongols drew closer.

Emperor Duzong was buried in the Yongshao Mausoleum on January 1275.

Family
Consorts and Issue:
 Empress, of the Quan clan (1241–1309), second cousin
 Zhao Shu (1264), second son
 Zhao Xian, Emperor Xiaogong (1271–1323), sixth son
 Pure Consort, of the Yang clan (d. 1279), personal name Juliang
 Zhao Huang, Prince Qichongjing (b. 1268), fourth son
 Zhao Shi, Duanzong (1269–1278), fifth son
 Princess
 Married Jiang Rixin
 Princess Jin
 Xiurong, of the Yu clan
 Zhao Xian, Duke Yichongding (1268–1270), third son
 Princess Xin'an Zhuangyi, first daughter
 Married Fang Daosheng
 Princess Zhenjing, personal name Guangyi
 Married Huang Cai
 Zhao Bing, Emperor (1272–1279), seventh son
 Zhaoyi, of the Wang clan (王昭仪), personal name Qinghui (清惠)
 Furen, of the Zhu clan (朱人 夫氏, d. 1276)
Unknown
 Zhao Chao, Prince Guangchongshan (1262–1263), first son

Ancestry

See also
 Chinese emperors family tree (middle)
 List of emperors of the Song dynasty
 Architecture of the Song dynasty
 Culture of the Song dynasty
 Economy of the Song dynasty
 History of the Song dynasty
 Society of the Song dynasty
 Technology of the Song dynasty

References

 

1240 births
1274 deaths
Southern Song emperors
13th-century Chinese monarchs
People from Shaoxing